Vida Juvan (17 June 1905 – 4 October 1998) was a Slovenian actress who won the Prešeren Award in 1971. In the United States she might be best known for a role in the horror film .

References

External links

Slovenian film actresses
Slovenian stage actresses
Slovenian television actresses
Prešeren Award laureates
Actors from Ljubljana
1905 births
1998 deaths
Television people from Ljubljana